The Illinois State Senate Election of 2016 determined, along with 19 senators not up for re-election, the membership of the 100th Illinois State Senate. The Democratic Party retained its majority, losing two seats - the 47th district in Western Illinois, and the 59th in the State's South - which were both won by Republicans.

Overview

Elections by district

District 1

District 2

District 4

District 5

District 7

District 8

District 10

District 11

District 13

District 14

District 16

District 17

District 19

District 20

District 22

District 23

District 25

District 26

District 28

District 29

District 31

District 32

District 34

District 35

District 37

District 38

District 40

District 41

District 43

District 44

District 46

District 47

District 49

District 50

District 52

District 53

District 55

District 56

District 58

District 59

References

Illinois State Board of Elections

Illinois Senate elections
2016 Illinois elections
Illinois Senate